The waterside hot water hay pellet furnace is a technology that was developed to convert grass and hay into energy that can be used in home heating, also known as grass pellet heating.

The waterside hot water hay pellet furnace was invented by Gus Swanson, a farmer from Pictou County, Nova Scotia.  Swanson came up with the idea after the search for an affordable alternative to home heating to oil after the price of oil began to increase. Swanson and two of his partners, Philip Landry and Jim Trussler, founded the company LST Energy Inc. as a way to grow and build their hay pellet furnace technology.

Development and method of operation

The waterside hot water hay pellet furnace converts hay pellets into energy by burning them in a furnace, wood stove, or pellet stove. The hay pellets are made from dried field hay (grass) that is harvested at the end of the season and then pressed into pellets.

Swanson developed a furnace with a local Pictou furnace maker, a Cape Breton company that makes pellet machines, and scientists at the Nova Scotia Agricultural College. While developing the furnace, Swanson and his team had problems related to the building up of glass that was produced when the hay was burning in the furnace. This is because hay contains sand and potassium chloride, sometimes referred to as clinkers, and its ashes are heavy. Therefore, when the hay is burning in the furnace, the sand turns into glass that can be up to an inch thick, and this was causing problems because the glass would build up enough that it was putting the fire out (which was the energy created by the burning of the hay). Thus, Swanson and his team had to find a way to break the newly formed glass back into sand. It took ten different prototype burning pots before one was created that had an ash breaker that would work.

The temperature in the water chamber of the furnace can reach the boiling point within seven minutes, and at that rate, the furnace can burn off the majority of the ash and leave little waste.
Once development was complete on the furnace, the final working prototype of the Waterside Hay Hot Water Pellet Furnace was 45 inches tall and around a foot in diameter. It can burn 50 – 125 pounds of pellets a day and releases 30,000 – 190,000 BTUs (British thermal units) an hour.

It is estimated that it will take 8,100 square meters of grass to heat an average Canadian home per year.

Key partners in development

Swanson and his company have received grants to help assist in the patent and safety certification testing from Agri-Futures Nova Scotia, which is the provincial distributor of funds through Agriculture and Agri-Food Canada’s Advancing Canadian Agriculture and Agri-Food (ACAAF) Program.

LST Energy Inc. received a $100,000 prize offered by Innovacorporation for winning first place in a regional technology start-up competition in 2010.

The Nova Scotia Agricultural College has been helping LST Energy Inc. develop the hay pellet furnace. In 2009, when LST Energy advanced to the final round of the regional technology start-up competition, they had one of their completed prototypes installed and up and running at the Agricultural College.

A Musquodoboit, Nova Scotia company was recruited to produce the hay pellets suitable for use in the furnace.

Benefits

Hay, which comes from grass, is an economically viable, renewable and sustainable resource.  Two acres of hay will heat an average home for the winter, and it would only take 4% of Canadian land to produce enough hay to heat every home. 
The hay pellets used in the furnace are also an environmentally friendly energy source. It is considered a carbon-neutral energy source. The hay pellet's burning efficiency is increased by its low moisture content, burns without producing any smoke, and is as clean or cleaner as any fossil fuel. Wood stoves release 45g of particulate/hour, while hay pellets only produce 1.2g/hour.

Research has been conducted to discover what type of grass is best suited for use in the Waterside Hot Water Hay Pellet Furnace, and it was found the reed canary hay pellets produced from reed canary grass is the most efficient grass pellet source. It emitted 90% less Carbon Dioxide (CO2) than heating oil, propane or natural gas. Eighteen thousand tons of CO2 can be saved from being emitted into the atmosphere for every 50 acres of reed canary grass burnt as hay pellets in the Waterside Hot Water Hay Pellet Furnace.

It’s a potential new source of income for the struggling agricultural industry.  This new furnace also has the potential to strengthen the agricultural community in Canada because farmers may soon be able to sell their hay for pellet production. Farmers currently make $30/ton of hay. However, it is predicted that if demand for hay increases because it is needed for pellet production, the farmers could potentially make up to $100/ton, with the consumer being charged $200/ton of pellets. Presently, one ton of hay is equivalent to around $700 worth of heating oil. It is predicted that a farm in Nova Scotia with 100 acres of hay could make up to $50,000 a year selling their hay for production of pellets that will be used in the furnace. An increase in demand for pellets made out of hay could also potentially increase jobs in rural farming areas across Canada.

Heating a home with hay pellets is a much cheaper alternative to that of oil. Swanson currently heats a three-bedroom apartment, a two-bedroom apartment, and a two-bedroom house using hay pellets, and it costs him only $300/month, compared to the $900/month it used to cost him when he was heating these properties with oil.

References

External links
Hot Water Furnace Burns Hay Pellets, FARM SHOW Magazine, 2011 - Volume #BFS, Issue #11, Page #50

Heating
Biofuel in the United States